Kevin Stevens (born April 15, 1965) is an American former ice hockey player and current scout in the National Hockey League (NHL). He played left wing on a line with Mario Lemieux during the Pittsburgh Penguins' Stanley Cup championships in  1991 and 1992. During his career, he also played with the Boston Bruins, Los Angeles Kings, New York Rangers, and Philadelphia Flyers. In 2017, Stevens was named Special Assignment Scout with the Penguins hockey organization.

Early career
Stevens was born in Brockton, Massachusetts, but grew up in Pembroke, Massachusetts. As a youth, he played in the 1978 Quebec International Pee-Wee Hockey Tournament with the Hobomock minor ice hockey team from Pembroke. While attending Silver Lake Regional High School in Kingston, Massachusetts, Kevin Stevens played both hockey and baseball. He was invited to try out for both the Toronto Blue Jays and the Philadelphia Phillies; however, accepting that he was not a great hitter in baseball, he decided to play hockey instead. Stevens accepted a full scholarship to play hockey for Boston College, and was drafted in the sixth round (108th overall) in the 1983 NHL draft by the Los Angeles Kings. Several months later, his rights were traded to the Pittsburgh Penguins for Anders Håkansson, a left winger from Sweden who had recently been traded to the Penguins along with Ron Meighan from the Minnesota North Stars for the Penguins' first round pick in the 1983 draft (Brian Lawton).

Upon graduating from Boston College in 1987, Stevens joined the U.S. National Team and represented the U.S. at the 1987 World Championships and at the 1988 Winter Olympics. Stevens' play steadily improved during his time with the team and in 1987-88 he finished with 45 points in 44 games.

NHL career
Stevens played a few games with the Penguins in the 1987–88 NHL season, then spent the 1988–89 NHL season jumping back and forth between the National Hockey League (NHL) and the Muskegon Lumberjacks of the International Hockey League (IHL). Starting with the 1989–90 NHL season, Stevens became one of the top left wingers and power forwards in the league. He had four consecutive seasons of at least 40 goals and 80 points from 1990–1994 and surpassed 50 goals and 100 points in 1991–92 and 1992–93. In the 1991–92 NHL season, Stevens scored 2 points more than Wayne Gretzky (then in his 13th season), becoming only the third person in NHL history to outscore Gretzky in the regular season, though he still finished second in points to teammate Mario Lemieux. His 123 points that year also set a record for the most points by an American-born player and a left wing in one season. The 55 goals he scored the following year tied him with Jimmy Carson for most goals in a single NHL season by a United States-born player. That record would stand for another 29 years before being broken by Auston Matthews on April 7, 2022. During the Pittsburgh Penguins' back-to-back Stanley Cup seasons of 1990–91 and 1991–92, Stevens was the only Penguin to play in every regular season and playoff game.  He is also one of four NHL players to have accumulated more than 50 goals and at least 200 PIM in a season, the others are Keith Tkachuk, Brendan Shanahan and Gary Roberts. His 17 goals during the 1990–91 playoffs are tied for fourth all-time (only Jari Kurri and Reggie Leach with 19 and Joe Sakic with 18 have surpassed that mark). He scored 13 more in the 1991–92 postseason.

On May 21, 1992, during game three of the Prince of Wales Conference final against the Boston Bruins, Stevens became the 25th player in NHL history to score three goals in a single playoff period. Scoring a hat trick in the first period, he would add one more goal before the end of the game. The Penguins swept the Bruins then swept the Chicago Blackhawks to win their second straight Stanley Cup.

One year later, on May 14, 1993, the Penguins were playing the New York Islanders in game seven of the Patrick Division finals. Early in the first period, Stevens skated in and checked Islanders' defenseman Rich Pilon, hitting Pilon's visor with so much force that he knocked himself unconscious. Stevens landed face first on the ice and, unable to soften the blow upon landing, shattered most of the bones in his face and required extensive reconstructive surgery. Doctors cut an incision below his hairline from ear-to-ear, which was later closed with over 100 stitches, peeled back his skin and reassembled the bones in Stevens' face with the use of metal plates. Stevens came back to have one more strong season for the Penguins, in 1993–94 (41 goals, 47 assists), before being traded the next year.

Stevens was sent to the Boston Bruins in 1995 along with Shawn McEachern for Glen Murray and Bryan Smolinski. After being traded from the Penguins, Stevens never again reached the success that he had while in Pittsburgh. After "disappointing" in Boston with 23 points in 41 games, he was traded to the Los Angeles Kings. After a poor season, he was traded to the New York Rangers in 1997, where he experienced several solid seasons, but failed to match the expectations levied on him from his marked success playing with Mario Lemieux and the Penguins.

During the 1999–2000 season, Stevens struggled. Not only did he rarely see the ice during this season, but after a game against the St. Louis Blues, he was caught in an East St. Louis, Illinois motel with a prostitute and crack cocaine. After this event, Stevens entered the NHL/NHLPA Substance Abuse and Behavioral Health Program.

After being released from the program, he played a brief stint with the Philadelphia Flyers before being traded to the Pittsburgh Penguins for a second time. After one decent season and another season where he rarely received playing time, he retired from the NHL in 2002.

Stevens returned the Penguins in an off-ice role as a talent scout from 2005 to 2012, including the 2008-09 NHL season, when the Penguins (and Stevens) won their third Stanley Cup. In 2017, he was hired again by the team, this time as a Special Assignment Scout.

Post-NHL
In 2011, Stevens left the Pittsburgh Penguins organization as a pro scout to spend more time with his family. He coached youth hockey including a traveling team in the Boston area.

In June 2015, his son, Luke Stevens, was drafted by the Carolina Hurricanes 5th round, 126th overall pick.  Luke played four years of college hockey at Yale University, but was ultimately not offered a contract by the Hurricanes, and signed a minor league contract with the Wilkes-Barre/Scranton Penguins of the AHL in August 2020.

In May 2016, Stevens and a co-defendant were charged with conspiracy and possession with intent to distribute oxycodone.

In May 2017, Stevens entered a guilty plea in a Boston federal court and was sentenced to probation, community service and a $10,000 fine. Stevens admitted to being addicted to prescription drugs since May 1993 (see above) when he sustained massive injuries during a game – an addiction that destroyed his marriage and his post-playing career in hockey.

On January 13, 2018, Stevens' recovery from addiction and his subsequent community service was presented in a 30-minute documentary entitled "Shattered" which aired on Sportsnet, a Canadian sports channel.

Awards and honors

Member of two Stanley Cup winning teams: 1991 and 1992 with the Pittsburgh Penguins
Selected to an NHL first All-Star team: 1992
Selected to two NHL second All-Star teams: 1991 and 1993
Selected to three NHL All-Star Games: 1991, 1992 and 1993
NHL playoffs most goals (17): 1991
Member of the Pittsburgh Penguins Ring of Honor that circled the former Mellon Arena

Transactions
September 9, 1983– Traded by the Los Angeles Kings to the Pittsburgh Penguins in exchange for Anders Hakansson.
August 2, 1995– Traded by the Pittsburgh Penguins, along with Shawn McEachern, to the Boston Bruins in exchange for Glen Murray, Bryan Smolinski and Boston's 1996 3rd round draft choice.
January 25, 1996– Traded by the Boston Bruins to the Los Angeles Kings in exchange for Rick Tocchet.
August 28, 1997– Traded by the Los Angeles Kings to the New York Rangers in exchange for Luc Robitaille.
July 7, 2000– Signed as free agent with the Philadelphia Flyers.
January 14, 2001– Traded by the Philadelphia Flyers to the Pittsburgh Penguins in exchange for John Slaney.

Career statistics

Regular season and playoffs
Bold indicates led league

International

See also
List of NHL players with 100-point seasons

References

External links
 

1965 births
Living people
American men's ice hockey left wingers
Boston Bruins players
Boston College Eagles men's ice hockey players
Ice hockey people from Massachusetts
Ice hockey players at the 1988 Winter Olympics
Los Angeles Kings draft picks
Los Angeles Kings players
National Hockey League All-Stars
New York Rangers players
Olympic ice hockey players of the United States
Sportspeople from Brockton, Massachusetts
People from Pembroke, Massachusetts
Philadelphia Flyers players
Pittsburgh Penguins players
Pittsburgh Penguins scouts
Sportspeople from Plymouth County, Massachusetts
Stanley Cup champions
AHCA Division I men's ice hockey All-Americans
Ice hockey players from Massachusetts